Ferenc Hegedűs (born 14 September 1959) is a Hungarian fencer, who won a silver medal in the team Épée competition at the 1992 Summer Olympics in Barcelona together with Krisztián Kulcsár, Gábor Totola, Ernõ Kolczonay and Iván Kovács.

References

1959 births
Living people
Hungarian male épée fencers
Fencers at the 1988 Summer Olympics
Fencers at the 1992 Summer Olympics
Olympic silver medalists for Hungary
Olympic fencers of Hungary
Olympic medalists in fencing
Medalists at the 1992 Summer Olympics
20th-century Hungarian people
21st-century Hungarian people